Sveti Tomaž may refer to several places in Slovenia: 

Brecljevo, a settlement in the Municipality of Šmarje pri Jelšah, known as Sveti Tomaž pri Šmarju until 1955
Municipality of Sveti Tomaž, a municipality in northeastern Slovenia
Škocjan, Koper, a settlement in the Municipality of Koper, known as Sveti Tomaž until 1955
Sveti Tomaž, Škofja Loka, a settlement in the Municipality of Škofja Loka
Sveti Tomaž, Sveti Tomaž, a settlement in the Municipality of Sveti Tomaž